Ilha Grande ( "Big Island") is an island located off the coast of Rio de Janeiro state, Brazil. The island, which is part of the municipality of Angra dos Reis, remains largely undeveloped. For almost a century it was closed by the Brazilian government to free movement or settlement because it first housed a leper colony and later a top-security prison (Colônia Penal de Dois Rios, later known as Instituto Penal Cândido Mendes). The Cândido Mendes prison, which housed some of the most dangerous prisoners within the Brazilian penal system, was finally closed in 1994. The largest village on the island is called Vila do Abraão with approximately 1900 inhabitants.

The highest point is the  Pico da Pedra D'Água. Most of its territory is within the Ilha Grande State Park. The remainder of the island is subject to stringent development restrictions.

On 5 July 2019, Ilha Grande and Paraty were inscribed as a UNESCO World Heritage Site.

Flora & fauna
The Ilha Grande is one of the most pristine remnants of Brazil's Atlantic rainforest making it one of the richest ecosystems in the world. As a hotspot for biodiversity and conservation, it holds some of the largest remaining populations of many endangered species, including the red-ruffed fruitcrow, the brown howler monkey, the maned sloth, the red-browed amazon parrot, and the broad-snouted caiman.  The seas around the island, which are also protected, feature a unique convergence of tropical, subtropical, and temperate-zone marine life, where it is possible to see corals and tropical fish including sharks, sea turtles, Magellanic penguins and cetaceans such as the southern right whale, humpback whale, Bryde's whale, orca, and dolphins.

The islands are contained within the  Tamoios Environmental Protection Area (APA), created in 1982.
The island (and APA) contains the Aventureiro Sustainable Development Reserve, created in 2014 from the former Aventureiro Marine State Park, which was integrated with the Praia do Sul Biological Reserve.
62.5% of the island is covered by the Ilha Grande State Park, making a total of 87% of the island protected.

Tourism industry
Most of the visitor facilities, lodging and the park headquarters are located at Vila do Abraão. The village may be reached from the mainland by local ferries. The island is a popular ecotourism destination. A popular activity for visitors is to trek to Lopes Mendes beach, about a two-hour hike from Vila do Abraão. Travel companies offer trips to see the island's various beaches, mountains trails and waterfalls.

On January 1, 2010, devastating mudslides killed at least 19 people on the island.

Gallery

References

External links

 Prefeitura de Angra dos Reis 
 Portal Turístico da Ilha Grande 
 O Caldeirão do Diabo
 Ilha Grande Travel Guide in English

Landforms of Rio de Janeiro (state)
Atlantic islands of Brazil
Protected areas of Rio de Janeiro (state)
Parks in Brazil
World Heritage Sites in Brazil
Angra dos Reis